Stop & Go is the first studio album by American musician Hamilton Bohannon. It was recorded and released in 1973 by Dakar/Brunswick Records. The most famous song of the record is Save Their Souls. It was frequently sampled in hip hop songs (e.g. "Cashmere Thoughts" by Jay-Z) and it was also included in the soundtrack of the video game Marc Ecko's Getting Up: Contents Under Pressure.

Track listing 

"The Pimp Walk" - 4:02
"Run It On Down Mr. DJ" - 6:43
"Save Their Souls" - 4:54
"Singing a Song For My Mother" - 6:27
"It's Time For Peace" - 2:17
"Happiness" - 4:00
"The Stop and Go" - 3:34
"Getting to the Other Side" - 3:17

Personnel

 Hamilton Bohannon - Drums, Percussion
 Ray Parker Jr. - Guitar
 Wah Wah Watson - Guitar
 Eddie Watkins- Bass
 Danny Turner - Flute, Tenor Saxophone
 Mose Davis - Organ
 Leroy Emmanuel - Guitar, Bongos, Spoons 
 Leslie Bass - Percussion
 Travis Biggs - Violin [Electric] 
 Kitty Haywood Singers - Vocals

References

External links
 

1973 debut albums
Funk albums by American artists